Karl Addicks (born 31 December 1950 in Amberg, Bavaria) is a German physician and politician of the Free Democratic Party (FDP). He served as a member of the Bundestag between 2004 and 2009.

Early Life
Addicks was born in Amberg in the administrative region of Oberpfalz, Bavaria on 31 December 1950. After obtaining his Abitur in 1969 he studied Medicine, Biology, and Chemistry in Saarbrücken and Hamburg. He joined the FDP in 1989.

Political career
Addicks was a member of the German Bundestag from 2004 until 2009. During that period, he served on the Committee on Economic Cooperation and Development. In addition to his committee assignments, Addicks was a member of the Berlin-Taipei Parliamentary Circle of Friends.

Other activities
 CARE Deutschland-Luxemburg, Member of the Board of Trustees
 Association of European Parliamentarians with Africa (AWEPA), Member
 Amnesty International, Member

References

1950 births
Living people
People from Amberg
University of Hamburg alumni
Members of the Bundestag for Saarland
Members of the Bundestag 2005–2009
Members of the Bundestag 2002–2005
Members of the Bundestag for the Free Democratic Party (Germany)